Thomas John Barkhuizen (born 4 July 1993) is an English professional footballer who plays a forward for EFL League One club Derby County.

Career

Blackpool
Born in Blackpool, Barkhuizen played junior football on the Fylde coast with Blackpool Rangers.

In May 2009 he signed on as a first-year scholar with Blackpool's youth department. Before that he had been at the Centre of Excellence for four months, and had scored in every game he played at both under-16 and under-17 levels.

On 24 August 2010, whilst still a second-year youth scholar, he made his first team debut in the second round of the 2010–11 League Cup, against Milton Keynes at Stadium MK. Assistant manager Steve Thompson said of Barkhuizen: "Tom has come through the youth set up and I felt he handled himself very well for his debut. He is not the finished article by a long shot but once he gets a little bit of strength I think we've got a decent player there. I thought he did fantastic."

In August 2011, he made a late substitute appearance in the League Cup defeat to Sheffield Wednesday before joining League Two side Hereford United on loan until the end of the year. He scored on his debut in a 4–1 Football League Trophy defeat to Bournemouth on 30 August. His first league goal came on 10 September 2011, in a 3–1 loss against Shrewsbury Town. On 20 December, after scoring seven goals for the Bulls, Barkhuizen stated that he wanted to stay at Edgar Street until the end of the season. His loan deal was extended until the end of the season on 9 January 2012. Then in late February, Barkhuizen would score his first brace despite losing 5–4 to Gillingham and then scored in a 2–1 win over Wimbledon, to end "a run of 10 home games without a win". Following the club's relegated to the Conference from League Two at the end of the 2011–12 season and made thirty eight appearances and scoring eleven times, Barkuizen was praised by Manager Jamie Pitman for his role as a striker and helping the club go into positive forms. Barkhuizen contract with Blackpool was extended for another year.

On 29 August 2012, Barkhuizen joined Blackpool's Fylde coast neighbours Fleetwood Town on loan until January 2013, together with teammate Ashley Eastham who joined on loan for one month. He made his debut three days later in a 4–1 win over Aldershot Town at Highbury Stadium. He scored his first and only goal for Fleetwood in a 2–1 win over Barnet on 29 September 2012. After five months at Fleetwood Town, Barkhuizen returned to his parent club. After this, Barkhuizen signed a one-year contract with the club following the end of the 2012–13 season.

On 24 August 2013, in his second league appearance for the club, Barkhuizen scored his first goal for Blackpool in a 1–0 win over Reading. His second goal for the club came in the FA Cup against Bolton Wanderers on 4 January 2014. However, his season soon was disrupted with fractured and dislocated collarbone injury that kept him out for six weeks and then made his return to action in early March. After the end of 2013–14 season, Barkhuizen making fourteen appearances, his contract with Blackpool after his 12-month contract was activated further.

Shortly after returning to Blackpool, Barkhuizen soon fractured his arm in a practice match that left him out for a month.

Morecambe
Barkhuizen joined League Two side Morecambe on 17 October 2014 for one month. The next day, on 18 October 2014, Barkhuizen made his debut for Morecambe, where he came on as a substitute for Paul Mullin in the second half, which Morecambe won 2–0 against Burton Albion. After making five appearances for Morecambe, it announced on 17 November that Barkhuizen would return to his parent club in conclusion to his loan spell at Morecambe.

On 9 May 2015, Barkhuizen joined Morecambe permanently on a two-year contract.

After Morecambe were late paying staff wages in November 2016 due to cash-flow problems, the option of selling a player was proposed. Barkhuzien's contract was duly cancelled by mutual consent on 9 November 2016, and Morecambe's wages were paid the same day.

Preston North End
On 17 November 2016, Barkhuizen agreed a pre-contract agreement with Preston, signing a -year contract and taking the number 29 shirt.

In July 2019 he signed a new three-year contract. He was released at the end of the 2021–22 season.

Derby County
On 2 July 2022, Barkhuizen joined Derby County on a free transfer, signing a two-year contract. He scored his first goal for Derby in an EFL Cup win over Mansfield Town on 9 August 2022.

Personal life
Barkhuizen went to Cardinal Allen Catholic High School in Fleetwood.
Barkhuizen is of South African descent through his grandfather, and the South Africa national football team showed an interest in calling him up.

Career Statistics

References

External links

1993 births
Living people
Sportspeople from Blackpool
English footballers
English people of South African descent
Association football forwards
Blackpool F.C. players
Hereford United F.C. players
Fleetwood Town F.C. players
Morecambe F.C. players
Derby County F.C. players
Preston North End F.C. players
English Football League players